The Oratorio di San Giacomo della Marina (translated as Oratory of St. James of the Marina) is a small chapel or prayer-house at the dockside in Genoa, northern Italy.

Erected in 1453, the oratory was rebuilt and decorated in the 17th century. Twelve large canvasses illustrating the saint and patron of the battle against the Moors, Saint James, were completed by major Genoese Baroque artists including:

Giovanni Benedetto Castiglione (il Grechetto) - St. James defeats the Moors
Giovanni Battista Carlone - St. James Opens the Gates of Coimbra to King Ferdinand and Martyrdom of St. James
Valerio Castello - Saint Peter Baptizes St. James
Giovanni Domenico Cappellino - St. James Preaching
Domenico Piola Martyrdom of the Saint
Giovanni Lorenzo Bertolotto - The Invention of the Spoglia
Aurelio Lomi - Sons of Zebedee with Jesus

The exterior of the oratory is unadorned. The confraternity was active in religious processions during past centuries.

Sources
 Genovanet entry
 Comune di Genova entry

Giacomo della Marina